This is a list of archives in Finland.

Archives in Finland 

 Aalto University Archives
 Åbo Akademi University Library : The Archive Collections
 Ålands landskapsarkiv (Archive of Åland)
 Brages Urklippsverk, Helsinki
 Finnish National Gallery Archives, Helsinki
 Hämeenlinnan maakunta-arkisto, Hämeenlinna
 Helsinki City Archives
 Joensuun maakunta-arkisto
 Jyväskylän maakunta-arkisto
 Literary Archives of the Finnish Literature Society (SKS)
 Mikkelin maakunta-arkisto
 National Archives of Finland
 National Audiovisual Institute
 National Library of Finland - Manuscript Collection
 Oulun maakunta-arkisto
 Sota-arkisto (Military Archives of Finland)
 Tampere City Archives
 Turku City Archives
 Turun maakunta-arkisto
 University of Helsinki Archive and Registration Services
 University of Jyväskylä - Registry Office and Archive 
 University of Oulu - Registry Office and Central Archive
 University of Turku - Records Management and Central Archives
 Vaasan maakunta-arkisto (Archives of Vaasa)

See also 

 List of archives
 List of museums in Finland
 Culture of Finland

External links 
 Family Search : Finland Archives and Libraries
 Aalto University Archives
 Åbo Akademi University Library : The Archive Collections
 Ålands landskapsarkiv
 Finnish National Gallery Archives
 Helsinki City Archives
 Literary Archives of the Finnish Literature Society
 National Library of Finland - Manuscript Collection
 Turku City Archives
 University of Helsinki Archive and Registration Services
 University of Turku - Records Management and Central Archives

 
Archives
Finland
Archives